Ioannis Giokas (born 22 January 1980), is a Greek politician. He has served as a member of the Hellenic Parliament since 2008, representing Attica for the Communist Party of Greece

Background
Giokas is a lawyer and member of the Athens Bar Association. He is fluent in English and German.

References 

1980 births
Living people
Politicians from Athens
Communist Party of Greece politicians
Greek MPs 2007–2009
Greek MPs 2009–2012
Greek MPs 2012 (May)
Greek MPs 2012–2014
Greek MPs 2015 (February–August)
21st-century Greek lawyers
Greek MPs 2015–2019
Greek MPs 2019–2023